The Gmunden Tramway is part of the tram-train-system Traunsee Tram, that opened in 2018 and is located in Upper Austria, Austria. The Traunsee Tram connects the shortest and oldest tram system in Austria with the Traunseebahn. It is operated by Stern & Hafferl, which was founded in 1893. The tramway was opened on 13 August 1894. It is 2.3 km long. The line's maximum gradient of 9.6% makes it one of the world's steepest surviving adhesion-only tram lines.

History
The works, directed by the engineers Josef Stern and Franz Hafferl, began on 25 February 1894. It took five months to build the entire tramway, one depot, one power plant and two buildings for employees. The original route ran from the railway station (named Rudolfsbahnhof at that time) to "Rathausplatz" (i.e. Town Hall Square). In 1975 the route was shortened to Franz-Josef-Platz. There were several renovations in the late 1990s and the following decade, including the renewal of "Keramik" station and of the Tennisplatz – Franz-Josef-Platz route. In February 2013, the municipal council of Gmunden decided to link the tram to the Traunseebahn and this opened in 2018.

Traunsee Tram
The tram-train system opened in 2018. The former route to Rathausplatz has been reactivated and a new route links to the new terminus of the Traunseebahn at Klosterplatz. The tram-train has its terminus in Vorchdorf. In Gmunden the tramway route runs entirely in the town, from the railway station to the central Franz-Josef-Platz on the Traunsee lake. It includes eight stations, with two closed and one replaced. A planned extension to the Seebahnhof, terminal station of the Traunsee Railway Gmunden-Vorchdorf has been partially built. This includes three stations and uses the route "Franz-Josef-Platz" - "Rathausplatz". The reopening of Postgebäude is not planned.

The line is unusual in that all platforms are on one side of this single track line. In view of this, the cars that run on it only have doors on one side but have driving positions at both ends.

Rolling stock 

List of all earlier trams, built between 1893 and 1907:

See also 
 Trams in Europe
 List of town tramway systems in Austria

Notes

References

External links 

 Track plan of the Gmunden tram system
 Verein Pro Gmundner Straßenbahn
 Stern&Hafferl
 Tram Travels: Verein Pro Gmundner Straßenbahn

Tramway
Tram transport in Austria
Metre gauge railways in Austria
Railway lines opened in 1894
1894 establishments in Austria-Hungary
600 V DC railway electrification
Town tramway systems by city